Allyl phenylacetate is an ester with a fruity honey odor, used in the perfume and flavoring industries. It is the ester resulting from the esterification of allyl alcohol and phenylacetic acid. It has not been reported to be found in nature.

Allyl phenylacetate is one of only a few known ligands for the human olfactory receptor OR51L1.

References

Acetate esters
Allyl compounds